Timo Suslov (born 2 July 1981) is an Estonian politician and police officer. He is a member of XIV Riigikogu.

He was born in Tallinn. In 2004, he graduated from Estonian Academy of Security Sciences.

References

1981 births
21st-century Estonian politicians
Estonian police officers
Estonian Reform Party politicians
Living people
Members of the Riigikogu, 2019–2023
Members of the Riigikogu, 2023–2027
Politicians from Tallinn